Altos del Rosario is a town and municipality located in the Bolívar Department, northern Colombia.

Climate
Altos del Rosario has a tropical monsoon climate (Am) with moderate to little rainfall from January to March and heavy to very heavy rainfall in the remaining months.

References

External links
 altos del rosario

Municipalities of Bolívar Department